Jenny Hoffman is an American quantum physicist and professor at Harvard University. She is interested in nanoscale engineering and imaging of materials, using molecular beam epitaxy and scanning probe microscopy. Hoffman has received several awards for her research and teaching, including the 2005 Presidential Early Career Award for Scientists and Engineers and 2010 Sloan Research Fellowship.

Early life and education 
Hoffman became interested in physics as a child, inspired by her mother, who taught high school physics. She studied physics at Harvard University, graduating in 1999 magna cum laude. Hoffman joined the University of California, Berkeley as a graduate student, working with Séamus Davis on the characterisation of Bismuth strontium calcium copper oxide.

Research 
Hoffman joined Stanford University as a postdoctoral research associate in Kathryn Moler's group. In 2005 she joined Harvard University as an assistant professor. Hoffman's group use layer by layer growth and high-resolution imaging of molecules. Using scanning tunneling spectroscopy they explained vortex pinning in high-temperature superconductors. She is also interested in topological insulators and strongly correlated materials.  She has won several large research grants, from National Science Foundation, the Alfred P. Sloan Foundation, Gordon and Betty Moore Foundation, United States – Israel Binational Science Foundation and the Air Force Research Laboratory. She has developed quasiparticle interference imaging and force microscopy to trigger electronic phase transitions.

In 2015, Hoffman joined University of British Columbia as a Canada Excellence Research Chair. The position was worth $10 million over seven years, enabling University of British Columbia to use atomic level 3D printing. She returned to Harvard University after less than a year.

Awards 
In 2013, the Radcliffe Institute for Advanced Study awarded her a fellowship to image complex oxides.

Athletics 
As an undergraduate at Harvard University, Hoffman rowed on the varsity crew team (lightweight). In her senior year, she began to run marathons, and has since taken up triathlons and ultramarathons.

Hoffman won the national title in the USA Track & Field National Championship 24 Hour Run in 2014, 2015 and 2016, and she was selected as the USATF athlete of the week in September 2016. She competed on the gold medal-winning team at the IAU 24 Hour World Championships in Belfast, UK in July 2017.

Personal records 
 Marathon - 3:23:08 (Lowell, MA, 2021)
 50K - 4:38:16 (Lake Waramaug, CT, 2015)
 100 Miles - 15:55:23 (Pine Creek, Wellsboro, PA, 2021)
 24 Hour - 142.07 miles (North Coast, Cleveland, OH, 2016)

References 

21st-century American physicists
Sloan Research Fellows
Harvard University alumni
Harvard University faculty
University of California, Berkeley alumni
Academic staff of the University of British Columbia
American women physicists
21st-century American women scientists
Quantum physicists
Living people
1978 births
American women academics